Futmalls (Chinese name: 預支未來) also known as Futmalls.com is a 2020 Taiwanese science fiction series by director Lai Chun-yu. Filming was completed on August 30, 2019, and it premiered on Youku on December 3, 2020. The show is co-produced by mm2 Entertainment.

Synopsis 
"Futmalls.com" (original title: "Future Malls", or Advance the Future in its Chinese name) is a 2020 science fiction drama series. It is directed by Lai Chun-yu.

The series is about three different stories that are connected to the website futmalls.com. Investigation into a series of strange cases leads police officer Zhao Xu-zhen to a mysterious website called "Futmalls.com," which claims to be from the future. There, customers can buy anything from the future from the site, including future love, fame and beauty. Futmalls is a mysterious shopping site, with an unlinkable URL where users are presumably randomly selected.

Cast

Main 

 Bryan Shu-hao Chang as Zhao Xu-zhen
 Eugenie Liu as Yang Nian-jun
 Bruce Hung as Li Zhong-wei
 Shao Yu-wei as Bai Yong-xin

Recurring 

 Allison Lin as Bai Yong-li
 River Huang as Liu Xiang-da
 Wu Chien-ho as Zhan Guo-xiang / Fu Chen-guang
 Phoebe Huang as Jiang Mei-zhen
 Chu Chung-heng as Chen Guan-ting
 Hu Wei-jie as Guo You-yi
 Lin Tzu-xi as An Zheng-mei
 Ban Tieh-hsiang as Uncle Fu
 Ting Chun-cheng as Zhuang Yun
 Wang Ko-yuan as Chen Kai-xiang

Special guest 

 Heaven Hai as chief editor
 Deng An-ning as commander
  as Mr. Yang, Nian-jun's father
 Lai Pei-hsia as Mrs. Yang, Nian-jun's mother
 Yang Da-jing as ceremony host

Episodes

Season 1 (2020)

References

External links 

Futmalls on myVideo (in Chinese)
Futmalls on Youku (in Chinese)

2020 Taiwanese television series debuts
2020 Taiwanese television series endings
2020s anthology television series
2020s crime television series
2020s science fiction television series
Crime thriller television series
Science fiction anthology television series
Taiwanese anthology television series
Taiwanese science fiction television series
Taiwanese thriller television series
Television shows about technology
Works about computer and internet companies
Works about cybercrime
Fictional brands
Fictional shops